A driver's permit, learner's permit, learner's license or provisional license is a restricted license that is given to a person who is learning to drive, but has not yet satisfied the prerequisite to obtain a driver's license. Having a learner's permit for a certain length of time is usually one of the requirements (along with driver's education and a road test) for applying for a full driver's license. To get a learner's permit, one must typically pass a written permit test, take a basic competency test in the vehicle, or both.

Australia
Laws regarding learner's permits in Australia differ between each state. However, all states require a number of hours supervised driving to be undertaken and for the permit to be held for a set period. The age to get a Learner Permit is 16 in all states and territories except the ACT where it is 15 and 9 months. When a person is on their learner's permit, they have to log 50–120 hours depending on the state they are in and must obtain at least 5-20 night hours. They can be supervised or taught in their log book hours by any person/persons holding a full license. They must sign the log book for allocated hours. Learner drivers must display an 'L' plate on their car and have a 0% BAC Blood Alcohol limit. Some states, do provide online applications to log these hours digitally.

Belgium
A provisional learners license can be obtained after passing a theoretical exam less than three years prior. The minimum age for a learners permit is 17 years. The learner needs to be accompanied by a designated person with a valid driving license. The vehicle needs to bear a clearly visible, predesignated "learners" sign, sporting the letter "L".

If you go to a driving school and follow 20 hours of lessons, you get another learner's permit. With this, you can drive with maximum two people who have had their driver's license for at least 8 years, or you can drive by yourself, but with some restrictions: you cannot drive between 10 p.m. and 6 a.m. on Fridays, Saturdays and Sundays; and you cannot drive on the evenings before a legal holiday, or the evening of the holiday itself.

Canada
In Canada, the minimum age varies from province to province and may be 14 or 16. In Ontario, a G1 License is issued to new drivers at the age of 16 after completing a written test. G1 license restrictions include:

Have time and/or road restrictions, and the learner must drive with a fully licensed driver of at least 4 years. After one year with a G2, the learner may upgrade to their full G class license by taking another road test, which has a major highway component. A similar program is in effect for motorcycles, the M class license.

In Nova Scotia, a beginner's permit (L) is issued to new drivers after the age of 16 after a written test.  The L license restrictions include:

 A fully licensed driver must sit in the seat adjacent the new driver
 There cannot be additional passengers
 The learner must have a blood alcohol count of 0
 No time or road restrictions
In Alberta, a learners permit is issued to those who complete a knowledge test, an eye exam and one who is 14 years of age or older. They're then put into a GDL program with restrictions. Some include: having a 0 blood alcohol level, fully licensed driver in the passenger seat, no more people than there are seats, and must hold the license for a one-year minimum before upgrading.

In Alberta, one has to pass a basic road test after having a learner's permit for at least a year and at or over the age of 16, then can apply for a Class 5 GDL license, which carries some of the same restrictions, but no longer requires a fully licensed Class 5 non-GDL driver in the passenger seat. Once the person becomes 18 and holds the Class 5 GDL license for at least 2 years, they can do an advanced road test which if they pass, they'll become a fully licensed Class 5 driver.

France

In France, there is Graduated driver licensing for people between the ages of 15 and 17 and half, for B Driving licence. There are some restrictions: for instance, a fully qualified driver must accompany the learner.

At age 18, the learner's permit can apply to a normal driving license, that it can pass more easily due to its previous experience; additionally, the length of the probation period (or permis probatoire) is lowered to two years.

This graduated driver licensing is valid only within France; thus one cannot use it to cross borders.

For people over 18, there is a system similar to Graduated driver licensing, but the rules are slightly different: for instance there is no reduction from three to two years for the probation licence.

Furthermore, once receiving a full driving license for the first time, the following restrictions apply for two or three years, known as permis probatoire: 
 Maximum speed 110 km/h instead of 130 on motorways, 100 km/h instead of 110, and 80 instead of 90 on rural roads.
 The permis probatoire has only six points while the regular permit has 12 points.
At the end of the two or three year period, assuming the driver made no infraction, the “permis probatoire” is automatically converted to a regular driver’s licence.

Some training to road traffic safety might help to recover points.

Germany
Since 2010, one can obtain a learner's permit at 17 in Germany. The only restriction is that a fully licensed and previously stated driver who is at least 30 years old must accompany the learner (but is not allowed to intervene in the drive). That does not apply to light motorcycles, which can be driven freely with this license.

Furthermore, the following restrictions apply for two years after obtaining a full license:

 The driver must have a blood alcohol count of 0 (this applies at least until the age of 21)
 Any penalties are stricter than for advanced drivers

At age 18, the learner's permit will be automatically replaced by a normal driving license - no further test is needed. These legal circumstances in Germany are comparable to those in Austria in that respect; thus, one can cross these countries' border with a learner's permit.

Hong Kong
In Hong Kong, any person aged 18 or above can apply for a Learner's Driving License for private cars, light goods vehicle and motorcycles. For other types of vehicle, the age required is 21 and the applicant must have a valid private car or light goods vehicle driving license for 3 years. Unlike other jurisdictions, a learner must be supervised by an approved driving instructor instead of an ordinary fully licensed driver, or attending an approved driving school to learn to drive (except motorcycles, which learners can drive on their own, but motorcycle learners must pass a motorcycle course from an approved driving school before they can learn to drive on road). L-plate is also required when the learner is practicing.

India
In India  the minimum age at which a provisional licence is valid is 18 (motorcycle/scooter). When driving under a provisional license, the learner must be accompanied by a driver who holds a full driving license. The supervisor has to be in view of the road and be in a position to control the vehicle. The provisional license is available only after passing the theory test. A full licence can be acquired only after passing the driving test. Once the learner has passed the theory test, they may take the practical driving test. Once the practical driving test has been taken and passed, a full driving licence will be automatically issued. While it is possible to take both tests immediately after each other, most learner drivers take a period between taking the theory and applying for a practical test to carry out driving lessons, either with their supervisor or a professional Driving school.

The vehicle being driven by the learner must also be fitted with L-plates on both the back and front of the vehicle. This tells other road users that the vehicle is being operated by a driver without their full license and that they may make mistakes easily and that the driver may not be fully competent yet. The L-plate consists of a white square plate with a large red L in the middle.

Ireland
In Ireland, the learner may perform a theory test at the age of 16 which tests their knowledge of traffic situations and road signs. Upon passing this test the learner will receive a learner's permit which permits them to drive on the road accompanied by a full licensed driver who has had their license for more than two years. The only restrictions are that the learner driver cannot drive on motorways and must visibly display 'L' plates at all times. They must have held their learner's permit for 6 months before they can apply to perform road test to obtain their full license. This is known as the 'six-month rule'.

Italy 
In Italy, any person aged 14 or above can apply for a driving license (patente di guida). For B licences, obtainable from 18 years old, learner has to perform a theory test which tests their knowledge of traffic situations, road signs, insurance, sanctions, etc. Upon passing this test (the learner has two opportunities to pass it), the learner will receive a learner's permit (foglio rosa, literally pink sheet, given its color) which allows them to drive on the road, if accompanied by a driver which had their license for more than ten years. There are no restrictions on the horsepower of the car (there will be during the first year of full license). The learner can drive on motorways and must display 'P' (standing for Principiante, beginner) stickers, both in the front and in the back of the vehicle. After receiving the foglio rosa, they have 6 months to perform a road test to obtain the full license; should the learner be unable to pass the road test in 6 months (two opportunities to pass it, spaced one month apart), they have to pay for another foglio rosa.

New Zealand

Learner licence
In New Zealand, any eligible person 16 years or over can sit a learner licence test for a class 1 vehicle (car) or class 6 vehicle (motorbike), which is a theory multiple choice test on road rules. Once they have passed the learner licence test and received their licence in the mail, they may drive with an adult who has had their full licence of the same class for at least two years (a 'supervisor'). They may carry passengers with a supervisor in the car, but learner motorcyclists may not carry a pillion passenger. They must display L plates at all times when driving and may observe the posted speed limits.

Restricted licence
After at least 6 months have passed, they must pass a practical test in order to receive their restricted license. On a restricted license, the learner may only drive between 5am - 10pm, with no passengers other than their dependent children, spouse or someone for whom they are the primary caregiver; they may drive at any time when accompanied by a supervisor. Learners who sit the practical test in an automatic car are only legally allowed to drive an automatic while on the restricted licence. If a driver has successfully completed an approved defensive driving course, the wait time between passing the restricted licence practical test and taking the full licence practical test is reduced from 18 months to 12 months.

Norway
In Norway,  the learner may drive as long the learner is over 16 years of age, have passed a basic course in the rules of the road and first aid, and a person 25 or above who has had their driver's license for more than 5 years is present.

Singapore
In Singapore, any persons aged 18 or above may obtain a provisional driving licence for a fee of S$25.00 after passing the Basic Theory Test. The provisional driving licence is valid for 6 months if the PDL licence is obtained before 1 December 2017. From 1 December 2017, the validity of a PDL licence is 2 years from the date of payment, with no change of cost. It permits the holder to drive on public roads (with a few exceptions) in the presence of a Certified Driving Instructor. A car driven by a learner must display an L-plate on the front and rear of the car. Passing the Final Theory Test enables a learner to apply for the Practical Driving Test and it is valid for 2 years. A valid provisional driving licence, passed FTT and a photo ID must be presented to be allowed to take the practical test. Should a learner's provisional driving licence expire before the date of their practical test, he or she will have to renew it at the same cost. Expired PDL are not accepted and taking the practical tests will be rejected.

A Qualified Driving Licence (QDL) is awarded to a person who has passed the practical test and made a one-time payment of S$50.00. Any person who has possessed a QDL for a period of less than a year is required to display a probation plate at the top right of their front and rear windscreens. The probation plate is made of a reflective material and consists of an orange triangle on a yellow background. Failure to do so may cause the offending driver to receive a fine for the first time and then subsequently revoked from driving.
See Driving licence in Singapore for detailed requirements of each class of licence.

South Africa
A South African learners license consists of three sections with the following criteria required:
 Rules of the road - There are 28 questions in this category with 22 being the pass mark
 Vehicle controls - There are 8 questions in this section, the required pass mark is 6
 Road signs, road markings and traffic signals -  There are 28 questions in this category with a pass mark of 23

There are primarily three codes to choose from:
 Code 1 - This is for motorcycles, motorised tricycle or quadricycle not more than 125cc and the driver should be 16 or older on the date of the test. If the motorcycle engine in above 125cc, the driver will need to be 17 years or older.
 Code 2- This is for motor vehicles, bus and minibus or goods vehicle up to a maximum vehicle mass of 3500 kg. The driver will need to be 17 years or older on the date of the test.
 Code 3 - This is for motor vehicles exceeding a gross vehicle mass of 3500 kg. The driver will need to be 18 years or older to apply for a learners license in this category.

The following documents will need to be presented when applying for a learners license:
 Identity card or passport
 2 Recent passport size photographs (colour or black and white)

In South Africa, any person who is of the minimum required age and holds a valid ID document may sit a learner's licence exam. The minimum required age varies by vehicle class and has the following minimum age restrictions:
 for a motorcycle (without a sidecar) with an engine not exceeding 125 cc – 16 years
 for light motor vehicles with a mass not exceeding 3 500 kilograms – 17 years
 for all other vehicles (also motorcycles with an engine exceeding 125 cc) – 18 years

The Learner's Licence exam is a 64 question multiple choice exam with questions spread over three sections: Rules of the road (28 questions); Signs, signals and road markings (28 questions), and vehicle controls (8 questions). 
 The holder of a learner’s licence is allowed to drive only when supervised by a licensed driver. If the category of vehicle being driven requires a professional driving permit, the licensed driver must also hold a professional driving permit. South African Learners must carry their Learner's Licence with them whenever they are driving a vehicle and have L plates on the rear window. The Learner's Licence is valid for 24 months.

Sweden
In Sweden, the minimum age is 16 years old to get a basic car learner's permit; 17 years and six months are required for more advanced light vehicle combinations and up to 23 years for heavy vehicle combinations. Körkortslag 4kap 2§ A Swedish Learner's permit does not require a test, but only allows practising with a teacher. The teacher, including a private teacher such as a parent, must also have a permit. After a successful test, a real driver's license is given, but there is a test period of two years when all tests have to be redone to get it back if the driver's permit is cancelled due to serious traffic violations or large speeding.

Thailand
In Thailand, the minimum age is 18 years old to obtain a temporary driving licence for cars and motorcycles, valid for 2 years. For motorcycles 110 cc or smaller, the minimum age is 15. A temporary driving licence holder may drive without supervision, but cannot apply for an International Driving Permit.

After holding the temporary driving licence for at least 1 year, the licence holder may apply for a full 5-year driving licence for the same type of vehicle (2-year car => 5-year car or 2-year motorcycle to 5-year motorcycle). A medical certificate and a physical evaluation of visual and reaction time are required. This process is commonly called "two to five" meaning a conversion of a two-year to a five-year licence, as opposed to a renewal of a full licence, "five to five". In the event a temporary small motorcycle licence is set to expire while the holder is younger than 18, the new licence will be a two-year temporary licence.

If the temporary licence has expired for one year, a written examination is required. In case of three years or longer, a practical exam and a lecture are also required.

United Kingdom
In the United Kingdom, the minimum age at which a provisional licence is valid is 17 (16 for driving a tractor, riding a moped or those receiving Disability Mobility Allowance). When driving under a provisional licence, the learner must be accompanied by a driver who has held a full driving licence for three years, and who is 21 or over. The supervisor has to be in view of the road, however the Road Traffic Act 1988 states that the supervisor does not have to be in the passenger seat, although the passenger in the front seat does have to be over the age of 15. A full licence can be acquired as soon as the provisional licence is received, unlike many other countries where applicants must wait a minimum of 6–12 months before getting a full license. The provisional licence is available without taking a test, although to get a full, unrestricted licence, the applicant must take a written 'Theory' test containing fifty multiple choice questions and a fourteen-clip hazard perception test, both of which are done on a computer at one of the many DVSA (Driving and Vehicle Standards Agency) Test centres. Once the learner has passed the theory test, they may take the practical driving test; however the practical driving test has to be passed within 2 years of completing the theory test, as the theory test certificate expires 2 years after receiving it. Once the practical driving test has been passed, a full driving licence will be automatically issued. One can take the practical test immediately after the theory test, but most learner drivers take some time between them to take driving lessons, usually with a professional driving instructor.

A vehicle being driven by a learner driver must be fitted with L-plates on both the back and front of the vehicle. These tell other road users that the vehicle is being operated by a driver without a full licence and that they may make mistakes easily and that the driver may not be fully competent yet. The L-plate consists of a white square plate (often tied to the vehicle or attached by magnets) with a large red L in the middle. (In Wales a D-plate (D for dysgwr, Welsh for "learner") may be used instead of an L-plate.) If the vehicle is operated by multiple named drivers (as specified by the car insurance policy), then the L-plate should be removed while the car is being driven by a holder of a full licence. When the learner has passed the test, they can display a non-compulsory 'P' plate, which shows that they have just passed their test, and so may not have much experience on the road. The P plate has a white background, with a green 'P'.

In the UK, provisional licence holders are not allowed to drive on motorways unless accompanied by a driving instructor and in a car fitted with dual controls.

After gaining a full licence, the driver is subject to a probationary period: six or more penalty points accumulated within two years of passing the test would lead to a revocation of the licence, and both tests would need to be retaken.

In Northern Ireland for one year after the passing of a driving test, the driver is defined as a "restricted driver" who must not exceed  and must display an "R-plate" consisting of an amber sans-serif R on a white background.

United States
In the United States, all states and Washington D.C. have graduated driver's license programs for teenage drivers. Although the specific requirements vary by state, in a typical program a minor must first obtain a learner's permit and meet specific requirements to qualify for an intermediate driver's license, before ultimately becoming eligible for a full driver's license.

Learner's permits
In order for a minor to receive a learner's permit, sometimes called an instructional permit, states typically require that the minor have at least 6 practice hours before getting the permit and signed permission from a parent or guardian. In the state of New Hampshire, a permit is not given but the young driver may begin to drive with a parent or guardian, or an adult 25 years of age, at the age of 15 and a half.

Typically, a driver operating with a learner's permit must be accompanied by an adult licensed driver who is at least 21 years of age or older and in the passenger seat of the vehicle at all times.

 
After a legally defined period of driving supervised with a permit, usually between six and twelve months, and upon reaching the requisite age, the holder of a learner's permit can apply for a provisional license. Obtaining a provisional license allows certain restrictions to be lifted from the driver, such as the times that they are allowed to drive, and the number of people allowed in the car.

Some states require the permit holder to document specific hours of driving under the permit before qualifying for an intermediate license, such as fifty hours of practice.

Intermediate license
An intermediate or provisional license allows the driver to drive a vehicle without supervision by a licensed driver. Driving is typically permitted during a limited range of mostly daylight hours, as well as to and from school, work and religious activities. Some states may require a road test before allowing a learner's permit holder to obtain an intermediate license.

In order to qualify for a provisional license the applicant must typically be at least the age of 16 and must have previously held a learner's permit for at least six months. These requirements vary by state. For example, in Florida the prior period for holding a learner's permit is twelve months.

In many states the period of driving on a learner's permit is shortened if the applicant is above the age of eighteen. For example, in Oklahoma if a driver is 18 or older a learner's permit must only be held for one month before the driver qualifies for an intermediate license. Some states allow drivers over the age of twenty-one to bypass the entire graduated licensing process. For example, in Colorado, a driver over the age of twenty-one may apply for and pass the tests for a permit and a full driver's license on the same day and, if successful in passing the tests, may obtain a full driver's license as soon as the driver passes a scheduled driving test.

Intermediate drivers are normally restricted in their transportation of passengers, especially minor passengers, without supervision. In some states, such as California, Nebraska, Oregon, Maine, New York, Florida, Kansas, Illinois, Oklahoma and Arizona, permitted drivers may legally drive family members under the age of 21 without adult supervision if they possess a signed note from a legal guardian.

References

Identity documents
Traffic law
Driving licences